Lonnie J. Eggleston (June 8, 1918 – July 10, 1998) was an American professional basketball player. He spent one season in the Basketball Association of America (BAA) as a member of the St. Louis Bombers during the 1948–49 season. He attended Oklahoma State University.

BAA career statistics

Regular season

External links
 

1918 births
1998 deaths
Basketball players from Texas
Oklahoma State Cowboys basketball players
Phillips 66ers players
St. Louis Bombers (NBA) players
Undrafted National Basketball Association players
American men's basketball players
Guards (basketball)
People from Fannin County, Texas